ROKS Gunsan (PCC-757) is a  of the Republic of Korea Navy (ROKN). The ship is named after the South Korean city of Gunsan.

Design

Armament

The ship's armament consists of two OTO Melara 76 mm/62 compact guns and two Otobreda DARDO 40 mm guns. The ship also carries Boeing RGM-84 Harpoon surface-to-surface missiles.

Gunsan was also supplied with six  Mark 46 torpedoes and twelve Mark 9 depth charges.

Service history
In 1984,  Gunsan was commissioned into the Korean Navy.

On 29 September 2011, Gunsan was decommissioned by the ROKN.

References

External links
 Korean Navy page on Pohang-class corvettes

1984 ships
Pohang-class corvettes
Ships built by Hyundai Heavy Industries Group
Corvettes of the Cold War